Richard Owain Evans is a Canadian keyboardist and composer of film and television music. His television scores include Rescue Mediums, Glenn Martin DDS, Ice Pilots NWT, Care Bears: Welcome to Care-a-Lot and Pyros.

Career
Evans was nominated for a Gemini Award in 2010 for "Best Original Music for a Lifestyle/Practical Information or Reality Program or Series" for the Rescue Mediums episode "Rockside - The Shape of Things to Come". 

Evans also composes new-age music and is a live keyboard performer. He was part of the band in the Toronto staging of the musical Come From Away in 2019.

Personal
His wife, Tamara Bernier Evans, is an actress and director. They have two children.

References

External links
Richard Evans at Humber College

Place of birth missing (living people)
Year of birth missing (living people)
Living people
Canadian composers
Canadian male composers